Saadia Kobashi (1902–24 January 1990) was a leader of the Yemenite Jewish community in Israel, and one of the signatories of the country's declaration of independence.

Biography 
Kobashi was born in Yemen in 1902. he migrated to Ottoman Palestine in 1909, settling in Jerusalem.

A member of the Jewish National Council and Moetzet HaAm on behalf of the Yemenite Association, he signed the declaration of independence in 1948 as S. Kobashi, adding HaLevi at the end (referring to the tribe of Levi). After independence, he moved to Tel Aviv and was appointed supervisor of the Religious-Zionist education system. He became headmaster of a religious-Zionist school in Rosh HaAyin in 1949,  where today a street is named after him.

References

1904 births
Yemenite Jews
Members of the Assembly of Representatives (Mandatory Palestine)
Signatories of the Israeli Declaration of Independence
Israeli educators
1990 deaths
Jewish National Council members
Yemenite Association politicians
Yemeni emigrants to the Ottoman Empire
Israeli people of Yemeni-Jewish descent